Chemakum (also written as Chimakum or Chimacum) is an extinct Chimakuan language once spoken by the Chemakum, a Native American group that once lived on western Washington state's Olympic Peninsula. It was reasonably closely related to the Quileute language, the only surviving Chimakuan language. In the 1860s, Chief Seattle and the Suquamish people killed many of the Chimakum people. In 1890, Franz Boas found out about only three speakers, and they spoke it imperfectly, of whom he managed to gather linguistic data from one, a woman named Louise Webster (her brother was another speaker of the three). Several years later in the 1920s, Manuel J. Andrade cross-checked some of Boas’ materials with the same speaker. A few semi-speakers continued until the 1940s on the east side of the Olympic Peninsula, between Port Townsend and Hood Canal.

The name Chemakum is an anglicization of the Salishan name for the Chimakum people, perhaps old Twana čə́mqəm (currently čə́bqəb ).

Phonology
Boas’ original article based on fieldwork with one of the last three native speakers in the summer of 1890 uses the following consonantal symbols: ‹h; k, ʞ, q; u; y; n; t; s, c, tç; ts, tc; m, p; l, lʻ; ′› along with ejectivization usually notated by a following ‹!› on stops and affricates, but sometimes also by a following ‹ߴ›. Labio-dorsals and the lateral ejective were analyzed as consonant clusters as the transcription shows. Based on his own description (in a footnote) and words and sentences cited, along with some comparison to Quileute cognates, the following phonemic inventory can be determined (the plain uvulars were probably pre-uvular and the plain stops and affricates were probably somewhat aspirated as in most languages of the region including Quileute):

Transcription isn't fully standardized and some amount of variation is attested. E.g., some instances of ejectives are double-marked with both ‹!› and a following ‹ߴ›. Compare the independent word ‘back’ written ‹ʞ!ߴē′enōkoat› against the corresponding lexical suffix is written ‹-ʞ!ĕnuk›. Similarly, the lexical suffix for ‘hand’ appears as ‹-t!ߴa›. Here, the Quileute cognate ‹-t̓ay› shows that, despite the notation, the sound was probably just an ejective t. Yet another notation for an ejective — simply a following apostrophe — may be found in the word ‹ʞ!ߴautߴátct› ‘bracelet’ if this is indeed cognate to Quileute ‹ḳ̓aḳ̓ʷò·t̓á·yat› ‘bracelet’, and in ‹tcߴālʻa› ‘stone’, cognate to Quileute ‹k̓á·t̓ƚa› ‘stone’.

The labio-dorsals were not analyzed as unit consonants by Boas. The audible rounding on them was either marked as a glide, or the rounding was notationally transferred to a neighboring vowel. Consider the following examples: ‹kuē′lʻ› ‘one’ (Quileute ‹wí·ƚ›), ‹lʻa′kua› ‘two’ (Quileute ‹ƚáʔw›), ‹ʞoā′lē› ‘three’ (Quileute ‹ḳʷáʔl›), ‹-kō› ‘canoe (lexical suffix)’ (Quileute ‹-kʷ›), ‹-ʞōs› ‘neck (lexical suffix)’ (Quileute ‹-ḳ̓ʷó·s›), ‹-tçuʞ› ‘our’ (Quileute ‹-t̓oqʷ›) etc.

The meaning of Boas’ ‹tç› is not entirely certain. Swadesh, working with Boas’ data half a decade later, decided to interpret ‹tç› as /t͡ʃʼ/ — in his notation ‹ч̓› — but it is not clear why, especially considering that /t͡ʃʼ/ is witten differently in ‹tcߴālʻa› ‘stone’. Boas himself describes the sound as “dento-alveolar t”, which isn't very helpful. Based on comparative evidence from Quileute, Powell interprets ‹tç› as a variant symbol for /t/ (perhaps notating some allophonic difference that Boas perceived).

Swadesh added a distinction between labio-velar and labio-uvular fricatives for which there is no explicit evidence in Boas’ paper yielding the system below:

Boas transcribed several distinct vowels in the published account of Chemakum (and a few more in his unpublished fieldnotes): ‹ā, a, ē, e, ĕ, ī, ō›, along with a marginal ‹u› whose main purpose was to indicate rounding adjacent to labio-dorsal consonants. The list was reduced to a much simpler phonemic inventory of three short vowels /i a o/ and three long vowels /iː aː oː/ by Powell. The vowels probably exhibited some amount of allophonic variation as Boas’ original transcription shows, but according to Andrade, less so than in Quileute.

See also
 Quileute language
 Chimakuan languages

References 

Chimakuan languages
Languages of the United States
Extinct languages of North America
Indigenous languages of Washington (state)